Iron Gwazi (formerly Gwazi) is a steel-track hybrid roller coaster at Busch Gardens Tampa Bay, a theme park in Tampa, Florida, United States. The ride, named after a fabled creature with a tiger's head and a lion's body, was built by Great Coasters International (GCI) as Gwazi, a wooden dueling roller coaster with two separate tracks. It opened to the public on June 18, 1999. Gwazi replaced the former Anheuser-Busch brewery that was located in the middle of the park.

Gwazi operated both tracks until 2012, with the closure of the tiger side. Following rising maintenance costs and declining ridership, the remaining side was closed in 2015. Following the closure, the wooden structure sat dormant for several years. Replacement attractions were considered by the park, including a remodeled roller coaster, an amphitheater, and a new attraction. In 2018, the park announced plans to refurbish the Gwazi structure, with Rocky Mountain Construction (RMC) listed as the roller coaster manufacturer in city applications. Site preparation began in late 2018.

In 2019, plans to refurbish the ride into Iron Gwazi, a steel-tracked coaster, were announced. RMC was hired to retrofit the existing layout with I-Box track using a portion of the original structure. The refurbished attraction was marketed as the tallest, steepest, and fastest hybrid roller coaster in North America. It was originally scheduled to open in 2020 but that was delayed several times due to the COVID-19 pandemic and other issues. Iron Gwazi soft-opened to passholder members on February 13, 2022, and to the general public on March 11, 2022.

History

Development 
In October 1995, Anheuser-Busch announced the closure of its Tampa brewery, which operated since the park's inaugural year. The brewery closed in December and was demolished afterwards, freeing up land in the middle of Busch Gardens Tampa Bay. To replace the brewery, the park chose a wooden roller coaster rather than a steel because of a growing preference for antiquated attractions. The park wanted to differentiate itself from other Florida theme parks with modern ride technology.

Mark Rose, then the park's vice-president for planning and design, chose the builder for the wooden roller coaster after touring several amusement parks over 17 days. He informally selected five roller coasters, seeking a prospective designer for a new Busch Gardens attraction, settling on Great Coasters International (GCI) for the project based on Wildcat; GCI's roller coaster at Hersheypark. Busch Entertainment (since renamed SeaWorld Entertainment) officials confirmed the choice and signed GCI. The new roller coaster's name, Gwazi, was conceived with the assistance of Washington University in St. Louis. The name Gwazi made reference to an African myth, after a fabled creature with a tiger's head and a lion's body, and its inner conflict.

In early June 1998, Busch Gardens Tampa Bay was considering an on-site expansion for a resort to compete with other Florida amusement parks, and a projected $10 million attraction was scheduled for a 1999 opening. In mid-month, Busch Entertainment, the owner of Busch Gardens Tampa Bay, filed a trademark for the name "Gwazi" with the United States Patent and Trademark Office. Groundbreaking began a month later, and Busch Gardens announced it that day. The dueling roller coasters were announced as the park's fifth coaster, the tracks themed as a lion and a tiger. It was also announced GCI would be building the roller coaster. The Tampa Tribune ran pictures of the hills under construction in November. Gwazi was reported to have been re-designed several times over the course of construction. By late April 1999, it was near completion and test runs began in late May.

Operation 
To promote the opening of Gwazi, park officials sold "first ride" tickets for a preview event in June 1999; of the 5,700 tickets 3,500 tickets were sold to pass-holders. Around 500 guests from American Coaster Enthusiasts were in attendance. Construction of the roller coaster's theming and the removal of excess wood were still being completed during the preview event. Gwazi opened the next day, as Florida's first dueling wooden roller coaster. Gwazi was the first wooden roller coaster to open at any Busch Entertainment park.

Gwazi developed a reputation for delivering a rough ride, despite regular maintenance. The lion side of the coaster was re-tracked in 2009, and the tiger side the following year. The last part of the overhaul included the installation of four GCI-designed Millennium Flyer trains to replace the roller coaster's original Philadelphia Toboggan Coasters (PTC) trains. Even with the re-tracking and new trains, Gwazi remained difficult to maintain and ridership kept decreasing. At the end of the 2012 season, the tiger side of Gwazi closed and soon after, a bridge was built across its loading platform; one of its trains was relocated to the lion track.

In December 2014, Busch Gardens Tampa Bay confirmed Gwazi's lion track would close due to low attendance, operating costs, and negative guest feedback. Gwazi's last train was dispatched in February 2015. The trains were reused on other rides at other SeaWorld park locations, including InvadR at Busch Gardens Williamsburg and Texas Stingray at SeaWorld San Antonio. Wooden planks from Gwazi were reused within Busch Gardens Tampa Bay and at other SeaWorld Entertainment Parks including SeaWorld Orlando.

Refurbishment and relaunch
When Gwazi was closed, Rose, by then the vice-president of park services, said there was no plan for the site but possible replacement attractions were being considered. A park spokesperson said engineers were discussing whether to add new elements, manufacture steel parts, or completely demolish the structure. Within three years of the closure, rumors circulated about a remodeled roller coaster, a new attraction, or an amphitheater replacing the Gwazi structure.

During a September 2018 news conference announcing the park's ninth roller coaster, Tigris, officials said there were construction plans for Gwazi in 2020. The same day, SeaWorld Entertainment applied to trademark "Iron Gwazi". In December, updated construction-permit applications sent to the city of Tampa listed Rocky Mountain Construction (RMC) as the ride manufacturer of an upcoming attraction in the Gwazi area. Site preparations and construction started in late 2018 for an attraction code-named "BGT 2020". A crane was seen at the site in January 2019. The park said it would announce more information about the replacement for Gwazi in March, after the completion of Tigris.

In March, the park announced Gwazi would be replaced with a hybrid roller coaster conversion by RMC. The new attraction was promoted as the steepest, fastest, and tallest hybrid roller coaster in North America. Placement of the roller coaster's track began in August. The following month, its name, "Iron Gwazi", was revealed. During the 2019 International Association of Amusement Parks and Attractions (IAAPA) Exposition in November, RMC unveiled the trains for Iron Gwazi.

Media outlets were given a tour of the site in January 2020, to see how the construction had progressed. Track work for Iron Gwazi was completed in March, and testing began the next day. Due to the COVID-19 pandemic, the initial opening date was missed and construction was halted at the testing phase after a week. RMC filed a lien against SeaWorld in May 2020 for $3.5 million out of $9 million the company says it was owed for work on Iron Gwazi, delaying further construction. As a result of the pandemic, SeaWorld Entertainment's preliminary second-quarter results included several approaches to reorganize its assets; with one plan to postpone all attractions scheduled to open in 2020 to the following year. In September, the park updated its website with a new anticipated opening date of early 2021. Two months later, the park released a point-of-view video of Iron Gwazi.

In August 2021, Busch Gardens postponed Iron Gwazi's launch a second time, until March 2022. In January 2022, the park announced Iron Gwazi would open on March 11 that year. It hosted a media day for Iron Gwazi in February. A soft-opening for passholder members began four days later, and the roller coaster opened to the general public on schedule.

Ride experience

Gwazi 
The ride experience of both the Lion and Tiger sides of Gwazi followed paths similar to each other as dueling roller coasters. Gwazi was promoted as the first dueling coaster with six "fly-bys", in which the two roller coasters pass each other in opposite directions at high speeds, giving the impression they will collide. Gwazi was also promoted as the largest-and-fastest dueling wooden roller coaster in the southeastern United States. One cycle of each ride took around 2 minutes.

Lion 

After leaving the station, the train moved forward before dipping into a right-handed U-turn to pass the other train. The train slightly climbed to the left then ascended the  lift hill. Once at the top, the train entered a pre-drop and turned right before descending the  drop and reaching its maximum speed of  near the bottom. The train banked slightly right before ascending into a left-banked turn through the lift hill of the tiger side, exiting downward, and entering a right-banked turnaround. The train then banked up into a left turn before traversing downward into the outer region of the layout, making multiple, slight-banked right turns. Afterward, the train entered a series of hills parallel to the opposite train, passing by the station before banking leftward into a downward spiral. The train descended before rising into a slight right turn, transitioning into a left turn and into the brake run. Completing the course, the train then turned right and then a slightly left before entering the station.

Tiger 
The train departed the station, moved forward into a slight right turn, then dipped into a U-turn to the left to pass the other train. It slightly climbed to the left before ascending the  lift hill. Once at the top, the train entered a pre-drop, turning left before descending the  drop and reaching its maximum speed of  near the bottom. The train slightly banked right before ascending into a banked right turn and a drop. Continuing the banked angle, it then climbed before dipping and then climbing into a left-banked turn, traversing a series of curves before turning towards the outer region of the layout in multiple, slight-banked left turns. The train then entered a series of hills, running parallel to the opposite train, passing by the station and entering a right-banked downward spiral. It slightly descended before rising into a slight-banked left turn, moving into a right turn, and then into the brake run. Completing the course, the train turned left and then slightly right before entering the station.

Iron Gwazi  
Iron Gwazi begins with a sharp left-hand turn, followed by a similar left turn but on a decline, gaining speed before a smaller left turn that leads to the 206 ft (63 m) lift hill section. As Gwazi crests the hill, the train slows down before dropping down its 91-degree drop, reaching its top speed of 76 mph (122 km/h). Gwazi then climbs another hill, which at the top, banks the opposite direction making an outer-bank turn.The coaster then returns towards the drop and begins to curve upwards to perform the 540-degree barrel roll downdrop under the coaster's truss lift hill. This is followed by an overbanked turn. Then the coaster climbs above the station and banks outward to perform an extended wave turn that persists until it snaps back once it is under the lift hill’s entrance. Then the coaster climbs a small off-axis hill, transitioning the coaster to a smaller wave turn that follows. Then the coaster enters a zero-g stall which extends over the exit of the first drop. A small outer-banked hill is followed by a turn into 2 successive off axis airtime hills. Iron Gwazi finishes off with a turnaround into an ejector airtime hill, and a sharp left turn slamming into the final break run. Upon completion, the train makes a left turn passing the car barn, and a final right turn before entering the station. One cycle of the roller coaster takes about two minutes to complete.

Characteristics

Wooden roller coaster 

Gwazi's footprint covered  previously occupied by the brewery. Gwazi was Great Coasters International (GCI)'s third project. Gwazi used  of treated southern yellow pine, two million bolts, and 4.4 million nails for tracks using ,  planks in eight layers. The structure of Gwazi was able to withstand  winds without riders. As opposed to some wooden roller coasters, Gwazi was not painted.

Gwazi was originally supplied with six-car PTC trains that were arranged with two seats across in two rows. According to designer Mike Boodley, brand-new GCI Millennium Flyer trains were offered but Busch Gardens did not want to use an unproven design. Following the 2011 season, the park replaced the PTC trains with Millennium Flyer trains. The four GCI trains had 12 cars with a single row two seats across. Both PTC and GCI trains could accommodate 24 riders, and had a lap-bar restraint system.

Gwazi's trains were commonly known as Lion and Tiger. Lion trains were mainly yellow and Tiger trains were mostly blue. Gwazi was themed around the struggle between territorial wildcats; the African lion and the Asian tiger. The surrounding plaza was similarly themed for each cat; the lion side included a desert-like atmosphere and the Tiger side had landscaping and streams.

Steel roller coaster 

Iron Gwazi was designed and built by RMC using portions of the original Gwazi coaster. Alan Schilke designed the I-Box track. Iron Gwazi occupies the same station that once housed both Gwazi tracks. Andrew Schaffer, director of design and engineering for the park, stated; "about 25 percent of the original wooden structure has been re-utilized, and 75 percent of the foundations". An additional  of lumber was added for structural support. The lift hill of Iron Gwazi uses steel rather than the wooden structure of its predecessor. Iron Gwazi is the tallest hybrid roller coaster in the world, tied with Zadra at Energylandia, another RMC-built roller coaster.

The roller coaster's theme is the crocodile; similar to other attractions at the park themed to an animal. The queue area has educational elements about the species and their conservation, with reptile-themed graphics and paint throughout. Iron Gwazi operates with two six-car RMC trains. Each car is arranged with two seats across in two rows, accommodating up to 24 riders per train, with lap-bar restraints. The lead car is themed as the head of a crocodile; its trains are green, purple, and blue. The track has a purple color scheme.

Comparison

Incidents 

In 2006, a 52-year-old Palm Harbor man collapsed after riding Gwazi; he was rushed to a local hospital where he died. It was determined that the roller coaster, which was functioning properly, had aggravated his high blood pressure.

In 2022, a guest riding Iron Gwazi during its preview hit their hand on a beam, prompting Busch Gardens to remove two beams. They refused medical treatment.

Reception and legacy 

Gwazi received generally positive reviews upon its debut. In a St. Petersburg Times report, guest reactions to the roller coaster were positive, many taking into account its twists and turns, air time, and smoothness. Levin Walker, writing for The Tampa Tribune, noted among guests, Gwazi was praised for its speed and initial drop; some riders commented on the partial rattle typical of wooden roller coasters. An editor for Park World, Paul Ruben, stated Gwazi had "everything a good coaster should have", and adding "it never slows down".

The opening of Gwazi in 1999 coincided with the debuts of several other major roller coasters at Florida theme parks, including Dueling Dragons and The Incredible Hulk Coaster at Universal's Islands of Adventure, and the Rock 'n' Roller Coaster at Disney-MGM Studios. Gwazi was one of several wooden roller coasters that opened in North America during a resurgence of interest in vintage-style attractions. Gwazi opened one month after the steel dueling roller coaster, Dueling Dragons. Dueling Dragons and Gwazi were frequently compared because of their dueling feature.

Iron Gwazi was positively reviewed by critics on its debut. Sharon Kennedy Wynne, writing for the Tampa Bay Times, described the it as "glass-smooth" and noted its numerous air time moments. Dewayne Bevil of Orlando Sentinel noted Iron Gwazi's anticipation and sustained pacing. American Coaster Enthusiasts members praised the ride's speedy maneuvers, smoothness, and its ability to be re-ridden. Bobbie Butterfield, a writer for Theme Park Insider, stated that from any seat, "Iron Gwazi is a winner", in addition to praising the roller coaster's signature "barrel roll drop" and later air time moments.

Awards 
Prior to its closure, Gwazi received several placements from Amusement Today Golden Ticket Awards. In its debut year, Iron Gwazi received the Golden Ticket Award for Best New Roller Coaster.

See also 
 List of attractions at Busch Gardens Tampa Bay
 Steel Vengeance, a similar steel-hybrid roller coaster that was refurbished by Rocky Mountain Construction in Ohio

References

External links 

 

Roller coasters in Tampa, Florida
Roller coasters introduced in 1999
Roller coasters introduced in 2022
Busch Gardens Tampa Bay
Roller coasters that closed in 2015
1999 establishments in Florida
2015 disestablishments in Florida
Hybrid roller coasters
Best New Roller Coaster winners
2022 establishments in Florida